W.K. Border is an American film producer, active from 1989 to 2007.

Filmography

 Bill & Ted's Excellent Adventure (1989)
 Lower Level (1991)
 Maniac Cop III: Badge of Silence (executive, 1992)
 American Yakuza (executive, 1993)
 Blue Tiger (executive, 1994)
 The Prophecy (executive, 1995)
 No Way Back (executive, 1995)
 Back to Back (1996)
 Drive (1997)
 Trekkies (1997)
 The Prophecy II (1998)
 Sweet Jane (1998)
 Suckers (1999)
 Six Day in Roswell (1999)
 Sex, Death & Eyeliner (1999)
 The Prophecy 3: The Ascent (2000)
 Hellraiser: Inferno (2000)
 Dracula 2000 (2000)
 Mimic 3: Sentinel (2003)
 Dracula II: Ascension (2003)
 Dracula III: Legacy (2005)
 American Pie Presents: The Naked Mile (2006)
 American Pie Presents: Beta House (2007)

References

American film producers